Shiliu is a railway station on the Taiwan Railways Administration West Coast line located in Douliu City, Yunlin County, Taiwan. The station does not contain many passenger amenities.

Overview 
This wooden station has two side platforms. The station originally had an island platform, but it was demolished after the station was converted to a depot. The station currently only serves local services and is considered a hikyō station.

History 
15 October 1905: Opened as Shiliuban-eki (石榴班驛).
19 September 1908: Due to lack of business, service ceased.
1941: Re-opened as Shiliuban Signal Field (石榴班信號場).
1945: Name changed to Shiliuban Switching Station (石榴班號誌站).
6 June 1950: Name changed to Shiliuban Station (石榴班車站). Upgraded to Class 3 station.
1 March 1955: Name changed to Shiliu Station (石榴站).
15 August 1990: Station is downgraded to a hikyō station. Management is now under Douliu Station.

Around the station 
 National Freeway 3
 Shiliuban River
 Soy Sauce Brewing Museum

See also
 List of railway stations in Taiwan

Railway stations served by Taiwan Railways Administration
Railway stations in Yunlin County